Tiger beetles are a family of beetles, Cicindelidae, known for their aggressive predatory habits and running speed. As of 2005, about 2,600 species and subspecies were known, with the richest diversity in the Oriental (Indo-Malayan) region, followed by the Neotropics. While historically treated as a subfamily of ground beetles (Carabidae) under the name Cicindelinae, several studies since 2020 indicated that they should be treated as a family, the Cicindelidae, which are a sister group to Carabidae within the Adephaga.

Description
Tiger beetles often have large bulging eyes, long, slender legs and large curved mandibles. All are predatory, both as adults and as larvae. The genus Cicindela has a cosmopolitan distribution. Other well-known genera include Tetracha, Omus, Amblycheila and Manticora. While members of the genus Cicindela are usually diurnal and may be out on the hottest days, Tetracha, Omus, Amblycheila and Manticora are all nocturnal. Both Cicindela and Tetracha are often brightly colored, while the other genera mentioned are usually uniform black in color. Tiger beetles in the genus Manticora are the largest in size of the subfamily. These live primarily in the dry regions of southern Africa.

The larvae of tiger beetles live in cylindrical burrows as much as a meter deep. They are large-headed, hump-backed grubs and use their humpbacks to flip backwards, for the purpose of capturing prey insects that wander over the ground. The fast-moving adults run down their prey and are extremely fast on the wing, their reaction times being of the same order as that of common houseflies. Some tiger beetles in the tropics are arboreal, but most run on the surface of the ground. They live along sea and lake shores, on sand dunes, around playa lakebeds and on clay banks or woodland paths, being particularly fond of sandy surfaces.

Tiger beetles are considered a good indicator species and have been used in ecological studies on biodiversity. Several species of wingless parasitic wasps in the genus Methocha (family Thynnidae), lay their eggs on larvae of various Cicindela spp., such as Cicindela dorsalis.

Adaptations
Tiger beetles display an unusual form of pursuit in which they alternatively sprint quickly toward their prey, then stop and visually reorient.  This may be because while running, the beetle is moving too fast for its visual system to accurately process images. To avoid obstacles while running they hold their antennae rigidly and directly in front of them to mechanically sense their environment. There are many tiger beetles that hunt in flat, sandy areas, and their eyes have flat-world adaptations, such as high-acuity perception streaks corresponding to the horizon. A tiger beetle uses the elevation of its potential prey in its visual field to determine how far away it is. As visual hunters, tiger beetles tend to hunt in open, relatively flat habitats, such as sand bars, woodland paths, and barren ground scrubland. In this sense, beetles might be expected to use elevation as a distance cue in their visual pursuit of prey.

Fossil record
The oldest fossil tiger beetle yet found, Cretotetracha grandis, comes from the Yixian Formation in Inner Mongolia, China, and dates to the early Cretaceous Period, 125 million years ago. Most fossils found are grey or yellow silty mudstone. Traits that identify Cretotetracha as Cicindelinae include long mandibles shaped like sickles, simple teeth arranged along the mandible's inner surface, antennae that attach to the head between the base of the mandibles and the eye. The left mandible is approximately 3.3 mm and the right mandible is approximately 4.2mm long. A long body form roughly around 8.1mm where the combined eyes and head are wider than the thorax, and long running legs.  Previously known Mesozoic fossils of tiger beetles have been described from the Crato Formation, about 113 million years ago and Oxycheilopsis cretacicus from the Santana Formation, 112 million years ago, both in Brazil.

Taxonomy
Tiger beetles had been treated either as a family Cicindelidae or as the subfamily Cicindelinae of the Carabidae (ground beetles) but since 2020, there has been growing evidence for the treatment as a separate family, that is sister to the Carabidae. Many genera are the result of the splitting of the large genus Cicindela, and many were described by the German entomologist Walther Horn.

Genera

 Abroscelis Hope, 1838 
 Amblycheila Say, 1829 
 Aniara Hope, 1838 
 Antennaria Dokhtouroff, 1883 
 Apteroessa Hope, 1838 
 Archidela Rivalier, 1963 
 Baloghiella Mandl, 1981 
 Bennigsenium W. Horn, 1897 
 Brasiella Rivalier, 1954 
 Caledonica Chaudoir, 1860 
 Caledonomorpha W. Horn, 1897 
 Callidema Guerin-Meneville, 1843
 Callytron Gistl, 1848 
 Calomera Motschulsky, 1862
 Calyptoglossa Jeannel, 1946 
 Cenothyla Rivalier, 1969 
 Cephalota Dokhtouroff, 1883
 Chaetodera Jeannel, 1946 
 Cheilonycha Lacordaire, 1843 
 Cheiloxya Guerin-Meneville, 1855 
 Cicindela Linnaeus, 1758
 Collyris Fabricius, 1801 
 Cratohaerea Chaudoir, 1850 
 Cretotetracha Zhao et al., 2019
 Ctenostoma Klug, 1821 
 Cylindera Westwood, 1831
 Darlingtonica Cassola, 1986 
 Derocrania Chaudoir, 1860
 Diastrophella Rivalier, 1957 
 Dilatotarsa Dokhtouroff, 1882 
 Distipsidera Westwood, 1837
 Dromica Dejean, 1826
 Dromicoida Werner, 1995 
 Dromochorus Guerin-Meneville, 1845 
 Ellipsoptera Dokhtouroff, 1883
 Enantiola Rivalier, 1961
 Eunota Rivalier, 1954 
 Euprosopus Dejean, 1825 
 Euryarthron Guerin-Meneville, 1849
 Eurymorpha Hope, 1838
 Euzona Rivalier, 1963 
 Grammognatha Motschulsky, 1850
 Grandopronotalia W. Horn, 1936 
 Guineica Rivalier, 1963 
 Habrodera Motschulsky, 1862
 Habroscelimorpha Dokhtouroff, 1883 
 Heptodonta Hope, 1838 
 Hypaetha Leconte, 1860 
 Hujia 
 Iresia Dejean, 1831
 Jansenia Chaudoir, 1865 
 Langea W. Horn, 1901 
 Leptognatha Rivalier, 1963
 Lophyra Motschulsky, 1859
 Macfarlandia Sumlin, 1981 
 Manautea Deuve, 2006 
 Mantica Kolbe, 1896
 Manticora Fabricius, 1781
 Megacephala Latreille, 1802
 Megalomma Westwood, 1842 
 Metriocheila Thomson, 1857
 Micromentignatha Sumlin, 1981 
 Microthylax Rivalier, 1954 
 Myriochila Motschulsky, 1862
 Naviauxella Cassola, 1988 
 Neochila Basilewsky, 1953 
 Neocicindela Rivalier, 1963 
 Neocollyris W. Horn, 1901
 Neolaphyra Bedel, 1895 
 Nickerlea W. Horn, 1899 
 Notospira Rivalier, 1961 
 Odontocheila Laporte, 1834
 Omus Eschscholtz, 1829 
 Opilidia Rivalier, 1954 
 Opisthencentrus W. Horn, 1893 
 Orthocindela Rivalier, 1972 
 Oxycheila Dejean, 1825 
 †Oxycheilopsis Cassola & Werner, 2004 
 Oxygonia Mannerheim, 1837
 Oxygoniola W. Horn, 1892
 Paraphysodeutera J. Moravec, 2002 
 Pentacomia Bates, 1872
 Peridexia Chaudoir, 1860
 Phaeoxantha Chaudoir, 1850
 Phyllodroma Lacordaire, 1843 
 Physodeutera Lacordaire, 1843 
 Picnochile Motschulsky, 1856 
 Platychile Macleay, 1825 
 Pogonostoma Klug, 1835 
 Polyrhanis Rivalier, 1963
 Pometon Fleutiaux, 1899 
 Prepusa Chaudoir, 1850 
 Probstia Cassola, 2002
 Pronyssa Bates, 1874 
 Pronyssiformia W. Horn, 1929 
 Prothyma Hope, 1838
 Prothymidia Rivalier, 1957
 Protocollyris Mandl, 1975
 Pseudotetracha Fleutiaux, 1894
 Pseudoxycheila Guerin-Meneville, 1839 
 Rhysopleura Sloane, 1906 
 Rhytidophaena Bates, 1891 
 Rivacindela Nidek, 1973 
 Ronhuberia J. Moravec & Kudrna, 2002 
 Salpingophora Rivalier, 1950 
 Socotrana Cassola & Wranik, 1998 
 Stenocosmia Rivalier, 1965 
 Sumlinia Cassola & Werner, 2001 
 Tetracha Hope, 1838
 Therates Latreille, 1816
 Thopeutica Schaum, 1861
 Tricondyla Latreille, 1822 
 Vata Fauvel, 1903 
 Waltherhornia Olsoufieff, 1934

Citations

General and cited references 
 "Further new country records of African Tiger Beetles with some taxonomical note (Coleoptera, Cicindelidae)" by Peter Schüle. Entomologia Africana 15(2), 2010.
 The Tiger beetles of Africa by Karl Werner, Taita Publishers 2000.
 "A Quantitative Analysis of Species Descriptions of Tiger Beetles (Coleoptera Cicindelidae), from 1758 to 2004, and Notes about Related Developments in Biodiversity Studies" by D.L. Pearson and F. Cassola. The Coleopterists Bulletin Vol 59, no. 2, June 2005.
 Tiger Beetles of Alberta: Killers on the Clay, Stalkers on the Sand by John Acorn. University of Alberta Press, 2001.
 Tiger Beetles: The Evolution, Ecology, and Diversity of the Cicindelids by David L. Pearson and Alfried P. Vogler. Cornell University Press, 2001.
 A Field Guide to the Tiger Beetles of the United States and Canada by David L. Pearson, C. Barry Knisley and Charles J. Kazilek. Oxford University Press, 2005.
 The Beetles of the World, volume 13 , volume 15 , volume 18 , and 20 volume 20 by Karl Werner, Sciences Nat, Venette, 1991, 1992, 1993 & 1995.

External links

 Cicindela Online
 https://web.archive.org/web/20060831202838/http://homepage3.nifty.com/trechinae/cicinw.htm 
 Planet's Coolest Critters—Tiger Beetles
 Tiger Beetles of the U.S.A.
 Tiger Beetles of Papua Indonesia
 Tiger beetles of Florida on the UF / IFAS Featured Creatures Web site
 Moravec J. (2010): Tiger Beetles of the Madagascan Region (Madagascar, Seychelles, Comoros, Mascarenes, and other islands) Taxonomic revision of the 17 genera occurring in the region (Coleoptera: Cicindelidae) (430 pp.)
 Siuslaw Hairy-Necked Tiger Beetle —Video produced by Oregon Field Guide
 Štrunc V. (2020): Tiger Beetles of the World - Illustrated guide to the genera, 338 species

 
Beetle families
Arthropod families